Atractus pachacamac, also known commonly as the Pachacamac ground snake, is a species of snake in the family Colubridae. The species can be found in Ecuador, Peru, and Colombia.

Etymology
The specific name, pachacamac, is from the Quechua word for the Incan creator of the earth.

References 

Atractus
Snakes of South America
Reptiles of Colombia
Reptiles of Ecuador
Reptiles of Peru
Reptiles described in 2021